Armel Junior Zohouri (born 5 April 2001) is an Ivorian professional footballer who plays as a right-back for Moldovan Super Liga club Sheriff Tiraspol.

Career
Zohouri began his career with RC Abidjan in Ivory Coast. In September 2020, he signed for Nice in France before joining Lausanne-Sport on loan for the 2020–21 season. He made his professional debut with the club in a 2–1 Swiss Super League loss to Basel on 25 November 2020. At the end of the season, Lausanne-Sport signed Zohouri on a permanent basis.

References

External links
 
 SFL Profile

2001 births
Living people
People from Divo, Ivory Coast
Ivorian footballers
Ivory Coast under-20 international footballers
OGC Nice players
FC Lausanne-Sport players
Ligue 1 (Ivory Coast) players
Swiss Super League players
Association football fullbacks
Ivorian expatriate footballers
Ivorian expatriate sportspeople in Switzerland
Expatriate footballers in Switzerland
Ivorian expatriate sportspeople in France
Expatriate footballers in France